This is a list of hazing-related deaths in the Philippines. This is not an exhaustive list. Inclusion in this list requires that the incident was described by the media as a hazing-related death. Majority of deaths in this list include but is not limited to cases that involve fraternities.

The first reported hazing death in the Philippines was that of Gonzalo Mariano Albert, a University of the Philippines Diliman student and an Upsilon Sigma Phi neophyte. He died in 1954.

The death of Leonardo Villa in 1991 led to the passage of the Anti-Hazing Act of 1995.

List

1950s–1990s

2000s

2010s

2020s

See also
List of hazing deaths in the United States
Hazing in Greek letter organizations
List of fraternities and sororities in the Philippines

References

hazing deaths
Education issues
Rites of passage
Death-related lists
Lists of people by cause of death
Accidental deaths in the Philippines
Hazing